Aurantiacibacter luteus is a Gram-negative and aerobic bacteria from the genus Aurantiacibacter which has been isolated from mangrove sediment from the Yunxiao mangrove National Nature Reserve in the Fujian Province in China.

References

Further reading 
 

Sphingomonadales
Bacteria described in 2015